"Don't Stop the Music" is a song by Swedish pop singer Robyn, released as the second single from her 2002 album of the same name. It was released in 2003 in Sweden, where it became a big hit, and peaked within the top ten on the Swedish Singles Chart. The song was later covered by Swedish girl pop group Play in 2004.

Track listing
European CD single
"Don't Stop the Music" (Main Mix) – 3:29
"Don't Stop the Music" (Instrumental) – 3:29

Swedish CD single
"Don't Stop the Music" (Main Mix) – 3:29
"Don't Stop the Music" (Ghost PM Remix) – 3:45
"Don't Stop the Music" (Cherno Jah Remix) – 3:50
"Don't Stop the Music" (Rigo Perez Remix) – 3:36
"Don't Stop the Music" (Twin Radio Edit) – 3:25
"Don't Stop the Music" (Twin Full Vocal 12" Mix) – 6:03

Charts

References

2002 singles
Robyn songs
Songs written by Alexander Kronlund
Songs written by Remee
Song recordings produced by Ghost (production team)
Songs written by Robyn
Songs written by Johan Ekhé
Songs written by Ulf Lindström
2002 songs